U.S. Route 82 (US 82) is a part of the U.S. Highway System that travels from Alamogordo, New Mexico, east to Brunswick, Georgia. In the U.S. state of New Mexico, US 82 extends from La Luz and ends at the Texas state line northeast of Lovington.

Route description

US 82 begins at an intersection with US highways 54 and 70 north of Alamogordo, and south of La Luz, New Mexico. Heading east out of Alamogordo the road quickly goes up into the Sacramento Mountains, traveling through the Lincoln National Forest. While climbing the steep Mexican Canyon, the highway passes the abandoned railroad trestles of the El Paso and Northeastern Railway, and passes through the only currently used road tunnel in New Mexico. The road then traverses the New Mexico villages of High Rolls, Cloudcroft, and Mayhill. After descending the mountains into the flat plains of eastern New Mexico, it generally follows a north-northeasterly bearing until Artesia, where it takes a more due-easterly bearing on through to Lovington, veering back slightly to the north before crossing into Texas.

Major intersections

References

Transportation in Otero County, New Mexico
Transportation in Chaves County, New Mexico
Transportation in Eddy County, New Mexico
Transportation in Lea County, New Mexico
 New Mexico
82